Igor Vasilyevich Slyusar (born May 22, 1989) is a Ukrainian professional ice hockey player currently playing for Bilyi Bars of the Professional Hockey League.

Awards and achievements
2009 Champion of Ukraine
2010 Champion of Ukraine

External links 

 Player's profile at Sokil Kyiv website

Ukrainian ice hockey forwards
Sportspeople from Kyiv
Living people
1989 births
Sokil Kyiv players